Marie Willem Frederik Treub (30 November 1858, Voorschoten – 24 July 1931, The Hague) was a Dutch politician.

Biography
Marie Willem Frederik Treub was born to Jacobus Petrus Treub, mayor of Voorschoten, and his wife Marie Louise Cornaz. Together with his two brothers Hector and Melchior, he enjoyed primary education in Voorschoten and attended the Gemeentelijke HBS in Leiden, from which he graduated in 1876. After having obtained enough funds in minor municipal positions in Voorschoten, he studies Law at Leiden University, and later at the University of Amsterdam, where he obtained his doctorate with his dissertation.

in 1885, Treub became a professor teaching tax law in Amsterdam, and he became an editor of the Weekblad voor Notarisambt en Registratie and the Sociaal Weekblad en Vragen des Tijds, notarial weeklies with a progressive liberal leaning, two years later. His political interest made him join the local classical liberal electoral association Burgerplicht, but it became apparent that its course could not be altered, and Willem Treub, along with others, established the radical electoral association Amsterdam. Treub was elected into the municipal council of Amsterdam in 1889, and became the city's alderman of finance in 1893. In this position, he introduced labour standards for municipal labourers, included clauses on minimum wages and maximum working hours in the scope statements of municipal projects, and instituted a municipal audit and construction supervision. As alderman for public works, an office he entered in 1895, Treub brought several private water supply and telephone companies under municipal ownership, and pushed for the nationalisation of tram and gas companies.

References
TREUB, Marie Willem Frederik (1858-1931) in the Biografisch Woordenboek van Nederland

External links

 
 
 

1858 births
1931 deaths
Aldermen of Amsterdam
People from Voorschoten
Radical League politicians
Liberal Union (Netherlands) politicians
Liberal State Party politicians
Free-thinking Democratic League politicians
Ministers of Finance of the Netherlands
Ministers of Economic Affairs of the Netherlands
Ministers of Agriculture of the Netherlands
Municipal councillors of Amsterdam
Members of the House of Representatives (Netherlands)
Leiden University alumni
University of Amsterdam alumni
Academic staff of the University of Amsterdam
Commanders of the Order of the Netherlands Lion